Handigund is a village in the southern state of Karnataka, India. Its name derives from Hainagund(ಹೈನಗುಂದ), which means "famous for milking". The village is the site of three private primary schools and four high schools and one PU college. It is located in the Raybag taluk of Belgaum district in Karnataka.

Demographics
 India census, Handigund had a population of 7382 with 3757 males and 3625 females.

See also
 Belgaum
 Districts of Karnataka

References

External links
 http://Belgaum.nic.in/

Villages in Belagavi district